Sheffield Hallam University (SHU) is a public research university in Sheffield, South Yorkshire, England. The university is based on two sites; the City Campus is located in the city centre near Sheffield railway station, while the Collegiate Crescent Campus is about two miles away in the Broomhall Estate off Ecclesall Road in south-west Sheffield. A third campus at Brent Cross Town in the London Borough of Barnet is expected to open for the 2025-26 academic year.

The university is the  largest university in the UK (out of ) with  students (of whom 4,400 are international students), 4,494 staff and 708 courses.

History

Foundation and growth
In 1843, as the industrial revolution gathered pace and Sheffield was on the verge of becoming the steel, tool and cutlery making capital of the world, the Sheffield School of Design was founded following lobbying by artist Benjamin Haydon. The day-to-day running was controlled by the local council, whilst the Board of Trade in London appointed the head. Tuition began in a 60x40ft rented room off Glossop Road. In 1850, the School of Design was renamed Sheffield School of Art.

In 1905, the City of Sheffield Training College (later renamed Sheffield City College of Education) on Collegiate Crescent admitted its first 90 students. During the First World War, the Collegiate Hall was requisitioned by the War Office to create the 3rd Northern General Hospital, a facility for the Royal Army Medical Corps to treat military casualties.

A new city centre campus was constructed during the 1960s. During construction, in February 1962, a tower crane on site collapsed during the Great Sheffield Gale. It crashed into the side of what would become the Owen Building, causing serious damage and setting back construction. In 1967, the Owen Building was completed. Built in a functional 1960s design, it has since been modernised and comprehensively renovated with an atrium linking it to four adjacent buildings. In 1969 the Sheffield School of Design merged with the city's College of Technology to form Sheffield Polytechnic. In 1976, Sheffield Polytechnic merged with the city's two teacher training colleges (Sheffield City College and Totley Hall College) and was renamed Sheffield City Polytechnic. In 1987 Sheffield City Polytechnic became a founding member of the Northern Consortium.

University status to present day
In 1992, Sheffield City Polytechnic became Sheffield Hallam University (SHU), with the right to award its own degrees.

In 2005, SHU was reorganised into four faculties.  The new Faculty of Development and Society, with an emphasis on 'people, places and spaces', brought together education, geography, humanities, law, and social sciences.  At the same time, with the intention of further developing research and teaching in the new Faculty of Health and Wellbeing, a new Clinical Academic Group was launched.  The building that had been designed and constructed to house the National Centre for Popular Music became the university's students' union building (the HUBS).  The Nelson Mandela Building, the former students' union building (when opened in 1978 was known as the Phoenix building), was sold and has since been demolished.

In 2007, SHU took over the teaching of nursing and midwifery from the University of Sheffield.  These activities are now based at the Collegiate Crescent Campus. The following year the Psalter Lane campus (formerly the Sheffield College of Art) was closed, and the activities transferred to the City Campus. The £26 million energy-efficient Furnival Building opened in September (renamed Cantor Building in 2011 in recognition of a major donor to the university).  The building, which includes teaching spaces and an art gallery has been described as "the impressive new entry point to the campus". For the 2025-26 academic year, the University expects to open its London campus at the Brent Cross Town development in the London Borough of Barnet. The campus will accommodate up to 5,000 students by 2030.

Organisation and governance

Colleges

 

In 2020, the university relaunched its structure moving away from four faculties and re-organising academic departments into colleges.

College of Business, Technology and Engineering (BTE)

Formerly known as the Sheffield Business School and prior to that the Faculty of Organisation and Management (OM).  The new college incorporated parts of the old Faculty Science, Technology and Arts (STA) previously known as the Faculty of Arts, Computing, Engineering and Sciences (ACES)
Sheffield Business School
Department of Finance, Accounting and Business Systems
Department of Management
Department of Service Sector Management
Department of Computing
Department of Engineering and Mathematics

College of Social Sciences and Arts (SSA)

Formerly known as the Faculty of Social Sciences and Humanities (SSH). The new college incorporated parts of the old Faculty Science, Technology and Arts (STA) previously known as the Faculty of Arts, Computing, Engineering and Sciences (ACES)
Department of Art and Design
Department of Media Arts and Communication
Department of the Natural and Built Environment
Sheffield Institute of Education (SIOE)
Department of Education, Childhood and Inclusion
Department of Teacher Education
TESOL Centre (Teaching English to Speakers of other Languages)
Department of Psychology, Sociology and Politics
Department of Humanities
Department of Law and Criminology

College of Health, Wellbeing and Life Sciences (HWLS)

Formerly the Faculty of Health and Wellbeing (HWB)
Department of Allied Health Professions
Department of Biosciences and Chemistry
Department of Nursing and Midwifery
Centre for Leadership
Centre for Postgraduate Medical and Dental Education
Academy of Sport and Physical Activity
Department of Social Work and Social Care and Community Studies

Research

Research centres
 Advanced Wellbeing Research Centre (AWRC)
 Biomolecular Sciences Research Centre (BMRC)
 Centre for Behavioural Science and Applied Psychology (CBSCAP)
 Centre for Development and Research in Education (CDARE)
 Centre for Regional Economic and Social Research (CRESR)
 Centre for Sport and Exercise Science (CSES)
 Centre for Sports Engineering Research (CSER)
 Design Futures Centre for Industrial Collaboration (Design Futures)
 Humanities Research Centre (HRC)
 Lab4Living
 National Centre of Excellence for Food Engineering (NCEFE)
 Sport Industry Research Centre (SIRC)
 Sport and Physical Activity Research Centre (SPARC)

Research institutes
 Cultural, Communication and Computing Research Institute (C3RI)
 Art, Design and Media Research Centre (ADRC)
 Communication and Computing Research Centre (CCRC)
 Materials and Engineering Research Institute (MERI)
 Centre for Automation and Robotics Research (CARR)
 National HIPIMS Technology Centre
 Polymers, Nanocomposites and Modelling Research Centre
 Structural Materials and Integrity Research Centre
 Thin Films Research Centre
 Sheffield Business School Research Institute (SBSRI)
 Sheffield Institute for Policy Studies (SIPS)
 Sheffield Institute of Education (SIoE)

Groups and networks
 Voluntary Action Research Group
 Film, Television, Theatre and Performance Research Network
 Health and Social Care Research
 Law Research Group
 Natural and Built Environment Research Group
 Outdoor Recreation Research Group
 Physical Activity, Wellness and Public Health Research Group (PAWPH)
 Sheffield Addiction Research Recovery Group
 Sport and Human Performance Research Group
 Sports Engineering Research Group
 Sports Industry Research Group

Through the research centres a number of spin-off companies have been formed, including: 
 Sheaf Solutions – automotive and aerospace organisation 
 Hallam Biotech – biotech analysis and synthesis 
 Materials Analysis & Research Services (MARS) – materials analysis and solutions 
 Bodycote – materials coating 
 Design Futures – product design, packaging design, research & strategy

Chancellors
British barrister, broadcaster, and life peer of the House of Lords, Helena Kennedy, was installed as chancellor in a ceremony at Cutlers' Hall on Thursday 26 July 2018.

Bryan Nicholson 1992–2001
Robert Winston, 2001–2018
Helena Kennedy, 2018–present

Academic profile

Lifelong Learning Network 
SHU is the lead partner for Higher Futures, the Lifelong Learning Network (LLN) for South Yorkshire, North Derbyshire and North Nottinghamshire.

Rankings and reputation
In the National Student Survey, several subject areas at SHU have performed very well in terms of overall student satisfaction with their courses: for example, architecture and geography have both been placed first, and planning has been placed second.

In the university league tables, Sheffield Hallam University was placed 47th out of 121 UK universities by The Guardian University Guide 2021; 65th out of 131 by The Times & Sunday Times Good University Guide 2020; and 67th out of 130 by the Complete University Guide 2021. In 2019, it ranked 485th among the universities around the world by SCImago Institutions Rankings.

Hallam received a First Class award and was ranked 15th out of 151 universities in the People & Planet University League 2015 which assesses universities on their environmental credentials. In 2020, the university was awarded The Times and Sunday Times University of the Year award for teaching quality.

Notable alumni

 Nazir Ahmed, Baron Ahmed, Labour Party Peer.
 Kid Acne, artist and musician
 Andy Akinwolere, TV presenter on Blue Peter
 Roma Babuniak, artist
 Graham Barnfield, pundit and happy slapping analyst
 Lee Blackett, Leeds Tykes rugby union player
 Peter Booth Australian modern bleak landscape painter.
 Richard Caborn, former Labour MP for Sheffield Central, and former Minister of Sport
 Andy Carthy, AKA Mr. Scruff, British DJ and artist
 Joanna Constantinidis, ceramist
 Eric Dancer, Lord Lieutenant of Devon
 Felicia Dorothea Kate Dover, 1870s student of Sheffield School of Art, and arsenic poisoner
 Richard O'Dwyer, TV Shack creator
 Graham Gristwood and Emily Benham, World Champions in Orienteering.
 Steven Hall, award-winning novelist
 Mark Herbert, (Film Studies 1991–94) film producer, and head of Sheffield-based Warp Films
 Stephanie Hill, classical-crossover singer and Miss England 2017
 Andrea Hirata, Indonesian Writer of  "The Rainbow Troops"
 Dame Kelly Holmes, double Olympic medallist 2004
 Chris Jones, Sale and England international rugby player
 Ben Jones-Bishop, Leeds Rhinos rugby league player
 Sean Lamont, Northampton and Scotland international rugby union player
 Tom Meeten, comedian and actor
 David Mellor CBE, international designer and cutlery-maker
 Martin Narey, CEO of Barnardo's, and former Director General of the Prison Service
 Kim Noble and Stuart Silver, (Noble and Silver), comedians, winners of 2000 Perrier Award for best newcomer
 Bruce Oldfield OBE, fashion designer
 Nick Park CBE, animator, creator of Wallace and Gromit and Oscar winner
 Stanley Royle, 20th-century landscape artist
 Steve Peat, World Championship winning downhill mountain biker
 Kenneth Steel, artist and engraver
 David Strettle, Harlequins and England international rugby player
 Joakim Sundström, sound designer
 Leon Taylor, Olympic diver (silver medal)
 Andy Whitfield, actor best known for his role in TV drama Spartacus.
 James Whitworth, (English 1992–95) national cartoonist & writer: Private Eye, Prospect, Sheffield Star & Sheffield Telegraph. Author of DCI Miller crime novels.
 Howard Wilkinson, Football Association technical director, former Leeds United and Sheffield Wednesday manager 
 Reuben Wu, artist and musician
 Astrid Zydower, sculptor.

Notable staff

 Alison Adam, professor of science, technology and society.
 Geoff Cartwright, senior lecturer in Environmental Conservation 1995–2012: joint winner of the 2011 Individual award in the Environment Awards of the Sheffield Telegraph for his work on the development of a nature reserve at Blackburn Meadows on the site of the former Tinsley sewage farm.
 I.M. Dharmadasa, applied physicist and researcher of low cost solar cells
 Hywel
Jones, materials scientist and inventor in advanced ceramics and metals, Principal Research Fellow
 Marina Lewycka (1946– ), senior lecturer in Media Studies 1998–2012, author of several novels including A Short History of Tractors in Ukrainian (2005)
 F.B. Pickering (1927–2017), metallurgist
 Jane Rogers, winner of the 2012 Arthur C. Clarke Award for the 'best science fiction novel of the year' for The Testament of Jessie Lamb
 Jawed Siddiqi, Professor of Software Engineering and Political Activist
 Frances Spalding, art historian, former lecturer
 Dave Wickett (1947–2012), lecturer in Economics, served on the industry and economics committee of the Campaign for Real Ale; in 1981 he established the Fat Cat (a real ale pub on Kelham Island) and in 1990 he launched Kelham Island Brewery; in 2004 his golden ale, Pale Rider, won Camra's Champion Beer of Britain award; in 2010 he set up a post-graduate course in brewing at Sheffield University, and in 2011 he was given a lifetime achievement award by the House of Commons all-party parliamentary beer group.
 Mike Wild (1939– ), senior lecturer in Environmental Studies 1969–1997, founder of the Five Weirs Walk group; co-founder of the Sheffield Wildlife Trust; and 2010 winner of the Lifetime Achievement Award in the Sheffield Telegraph's Environment Awards

See also 
 Armorial of UK universities
 Hallam FC
 List of universities in the UK
 National Centre for Popular Music
 Post-1992 universities
 Psalter Lane Campus
 UTC Sheffield City Centre and UTC Sheffield Olympic Legacy Park
 University of Sheffield

References

External links

 
 Sheffield Hallam Students' Union

 
Educational institutions established in 1992
1992 establishments in England
University Alliance
Buildings and structures in Sheffield
Tourist attractions in Sheffield
Universities UK